João Henrique de Andrade Amaral (born 13 October 1981, in São Paulo) is a Brazilian footballer, who is currently a free agent.

Football career
Andrade born in São Paulo, one of the two cities famous of football and its products (another is Rio de Janeiro). After his contract with Vasco da Gama finished, he joined Sporting Braga on January, 2007, signed a contract last until 30 June 2010.

He was returned to Vasco da Gama in July 2007, signed a two-year deal.

While under contract with Vasco da Gama, Andrade agreed a pre-contract deal with Cádiz to join them in July 2008 on a 2-year deal with a further 1-year extension option. In 2009 he signed with Sport Recife.

In November 2009 Sport Recife released midfielder by mutual agreement, making him a free agent now. On 9 February 2010 Coritiba Foot Ball Club signed former Sport Recife midfielder on a free transfer.

References

External links
  CBF
sambafoot

1981 births
Living people
Brazilian footballers
Brazilian expatriate footballers
CR Vasco da Gama players
Mirassol Futebol Clube players
Footballers from São Paulo
Primeira Liga players
Santa Cruz Futebol Clube players
Santos FC players
S.C. Braga players
Brasiliense Futebol Clube players
Association football midfielders